When a work's copyright expires, it enters the public domain. The following is a list of works that enter the public domain in 2026. Since laws vary globally, the copyright status of some works are not uniform.

Entering the public domain in countries with life + 70 years

With the exception of Belarus (Life + 50 years) and Spain (which has a copyright term of Life + 80 years for creators that died before 1987), a work enters the public domain in Europe 70 years after the creator's death, if it was published during the creator's lifetime. For previously unpublished material, those who publish it first will have the publication rights for 25 years. 2026 marks the first year since 2006 that works will enter the public domain in Australia, which changed its copyright term length from a "plus 50" law to a "plus 70" law in 2004. The list is sorted alphabetically and includes a notable work of the creator that entered the public domain on 1 January 2026.

Entering the public domain in Spain

Spain has a copyright term of life + 80 years for creators that died before 1987. The list is sorted alphabetically and includes a notable work of the creator that entered the public domain on 1 January 2026.

Countries with life + 60 years
India

Entering the public domain in countries with life + 50 years

In most countries of Africa and Asia, as well as Belarus, Bolivia, Canada, New Zealand, Egypt and Uruguay; a work enters the public domain 50 years after the creator's death.

Entering the public domain in the United States

Under the Copyright Term Extension Act, books published in 1930, films released in 1930, and other works published in 1930, will enter the public domain in 2026. Sound recordings that were published in 1925 will enter the public domain.

Unpublished works whose authors died in 1955 will enter the public domain.

Among the literary works that will enter public domain in 2026 is Dashiell Hammett's detective novel The Maltese Falcon, H. Rider Haggard's final work Belshazzar, Armitage Trail's novel Scarface, and Carolyn Keene's The Secret of the Old Clock and the character Nancy Drew (although only the original 1930 text). Also entering the public domain this year are the films All Quiet on the Western Front, Anna Christie, Hell's Angels, and The Big Trail.

See also
 1955 in literature and 1975 in literature for deaths of writers
 Public Domain Day
 Creative Commons

References

External links
 
 
Popular Books of 1930 at Goodreads

Public domain
Public domain